Life's Highway is a studio album by American country artist Jeannie Seely. It was released on December 9, 2003, via OMS Records. It was co-produced by Hugh Moore and Billy Troy. Life's Highway was Seely's fourteenth studio recording and first album in several years to be released outside her own record label. The album received critical acclaim for its blend of the country, bluegrass and folk music genres.

Background and content
Life's Highway was recorded at the Hilltop Studio, located in Nashville, Tennessee. The sessions were co-produced by Hugh Moore and Billy Troy. It was Seely's first album in almost ten years to not be self-produced. Although considered by some to be a bluegrass-styled project, Seely did want to call it that. "Simply out of respect for the true bluegrass artists, I wouldn't even venture to call it that. You know, I don't pretend to be able to do (bluegrass)," she said. Other writers considered the record to be an acoustic project, which Seely agreed with. The album included notable bluegrass musicians, including Sharon and Cheryl White of the group The Whites. Jesse McReynolds is also featured on the album playing the mandolin.

The album contained 13 tracks that were all newly recorded by Seely. Four tracks were new recordings by Seely. The additional songs were cover versions of recordings previously made successful by other music artists. The title track was a cover of the number one single by Steve Wariner. The fifth track, "The River", was a cover of the single originally made a hit by Garth Brooks. The eighth track, "It's a Heartache", was made most popular as a pop hit by Bonnie Tyler. The latter Seely considered to be among her favorites on the album. "In fact, to me that's the airplay cut on the album because I can see that getting people's attention and the uniqueness of it," Seely commented in a 2003 interview.

Release and critical reception
Life's Highway was first released on December 9, 2003, via OMS Records in a compact disc format. The album was also released digitally to retailers where it was issued under EMI Blackwood.

Following its release, the album received critical acclaim from many industry writers. Bob Mitchell of the Louisville Music News gave the album a positive response in his 2004 review. He believed the album to resemble country rather than bluegrass music. "Overall, this recording lacks the earthy intensity and drive that characterizes authentic traditional Bluegrass. But, make no mistake, Life's Highway is enjoyable and features some of country and bluegrass's finest musicians," Mitchell commented. The album also received a positive response from John Lupton of Country Standard Time in 2003. Lupton called the record "chuck top full of bluegrass talent."

Track listing

Personnel
All credits are adapted from the liner notes of Life's Highway and from Allmusic.

Musical personnel

 Jim Brown – acoustic guitar
 Glen Duncan – fiddle
 Kevin Grantt – bass
 Josh Graves – dobro
 Rob Ickes – dobro
 Charlie Louvin – harmony vocals
 Jesse McReynolds – mandolin
 Hugh Moore – banjo
 Jennifer O'Brien – harmony vocals
 Bobby Osborne – harmony vocals
 Sonny Osborne – harmony vocals
 Jeannie Seely – lead vocals
 Billy Troy – guitar, harmony vocals
 Steve Wariner – acoustic guitar
 Buck White – mandolin
 Cheryl White – harmony vocals
 Sharon White – harmony vocals
 Terri Williams – vocal harmony

Technical personnel
 Valorie Cole – make-up
 David Glasser – mastering
 Beth Gwinn – cover photo
 John Nicholson – engineering
 Hugh Moore – producer
 Billy Troy – producer

Release history

References

2003 albums
Jeannie Seely albums